Pietro Ricchi (1606 – 15 August 1675) was an Italian painter of the Baroque period, born in Lucca.

He traveled widely thorough Northern Italy. He was a pupil of the painter Domenico Passignano and Guido Reni. He painted an altarpiece for the church of San Francesco in Lucca. 

Ricchi died in Udine in 1675.

References

External links

1606 births
1675 deaths
17th-century Italian painters
Italian male painters
Painters from Lucca
Italian Baroque painters